Jean-Gabriel Albicocco (15 February 1936, Cannes – 10 April 2001, Rio de Janeiro) was a French film director.

In 1960 he married French actress and singer Marie Laforêt. He is considered a figure of the French New Wave cinema or Nouvelle Vague.

Films
 1961 : La Fille aux yeux d'or
 1962 : Le Rat d'Amérique
 1967 : Le Grand Meaulnes
 1970 : Le Cœur fou
 1971 : Le Petit matin
 1971 :  (anthology film)

External links
 

French film directors
1936 births
2001 deaths